Tattooed Heart is a 2016 album by Ronnie Dunn.

Tattooed Heart may also refer to:
 "Tattooed Heart", the title track from the Ronnie Dunn album
 "Tattooed Heart", a song by Ariana Grande from the album Yours Truly, 2013